Russia women's national softball team is the national team for Russia.  The team competed at the 2002 ISF Women's World Championship in Saskatoon, Saskatchewan where they finished thirteenth.

References

External links 
 International Softball Federation

Softball
Women's national softball teams
Softball in Russia